North Central Missouri College (formerly Trenton Junior College) is a public community college in Trenton, Missouri. Founded in 1925, the campus has grown to include nine buildings used as instruction facilities, library and testing center, a tutoring center, a community center, a student center, a career center, an art gallery, two residence halls, and a technology center.
 
In 2011, NCMC opened the Barton Farm Campus just south of Trenton. The campus includes three classroom buildings: the Lager Laboratory of Plant & Energy Science, the Metcalf Mechanical Resource Center and Kuttler Animal Science building. The farm campus encompasses 138 acres of farm ground given to the College by the Barton family. A wind turbine, two-acre pond, and numerous test plots are located on the farm campus to support learning.

NCMC is accredited by the Higher Learning Commission.

Athletics
The school competes in Division II of the National Junior College Athletic Association.  Its mascot is the Pirates.
Men - Baseball, Basketball, Golf
Women -Softball, Basketball, Golf

Satellite campuses
 Maryville - NCMC offers both Level 1 and Level 2 Nursing programs at the Northwest Technical Center in Maryville, Missouri.  
 Bethany - NCMC offers the Level 1 Nursing program at the North Central Career Center in Bethany, Missouri.
 North Belt Center - NCMC offers various classes at the North Belt Center in Country Club, Missouri, one mile north of St. Joseph, Missouri.

Notable alumni
Rex Barnett (born 1938), politician, and former officer of the Missouri State Highway Patrol

References

External links
Official website

Buildings and structures in Grundy County, Missouri
Educational institutions established in 1925
Education in Grundy County, Missouri
Community colleges in Missouri
Two-year colleges in the United States
NJCAA athletics
1925 establishments in Missouri